Let's Get Serious is the sixth studio album by Jermaine Jackson, released in 1980. It reached #6 on the Billboard album chart and logged five weeks at No. 1 on the Top R&B chart.  It achieved sales of 900,000 copies in the United States and it sold 2 million copies worldwide.

The title track was 1980's biggest soul hit of the year and a top ten pop hit as well. This is the most successful album of Jackson's career.

Background
After splitting with his brothers, The Jacksons, Jackson recorded three solo albums that fared poorly. Needing a success, he enlisted the aid of family friend and labelmate Stevie Wonder, who wrote and produced three songs, including the title track and first single, "Let's Get Serious". Jackson would oversee the other tracks on the album. This formula worked, as Jackson finally scored a hit with both the album and single.

It was one of the featured titles in a major Motown 20th Anniversary television, radio and print campaign. This gave the album prominent advertising benefits throughout the entire year.

Critical reception

AllMusic critic John Lowe stated, "The best of his Motown albums features Stevie Wonder's brilliant songs and production. For once Jermaine sounded inspired, and that feeling is sustained throughtout [sic]. One of the high points in his career, and the effort was worth it."

Track listing

Personnel
 Jermaine Jackson – lead vocals, backing vocals, finger snaps (1, 2, 6), keyboards (3, 4, 5, 7), bass guitar (3, 4, 5, 7), percussion (3, 4, 5, 7); horn, rhythm and string arrangements (3, 4, 5, 7)
 Stevie Wonder – Fender Rhodes (1, 2, 6), acoustic piano (1, 2, 6), synthesizers (1, 2, 6), celesta (1, 2, 6), guitar (1, 2, 6), drums (1, 2, 6), finger snaps (1, 2, 6), arrangements (1, 2, 6), backing vocals (1, 2, 6)
 Isaiah Sanders – clavinet (1, 2, 6)
 Kevin Bassinson – keyboards (3, 4, 5, 7)
 Greg Phillinganes – keyboards (3, 4, 5, 7)
 Joe Sample – keyboards (3, 4, 5, 7)
 Gary S. Scott – synth bass (3, 4, 5, 7)
 Ben Bridges – guitar (1, 2, 6)
 Rick Zunigar – guitar (1, 2, 6)
 Paul Jackson, Jr. – guitar (3, 4, 5, 7), percussion (3, 4, 5, 7), rhythm arrangements (3)
 Tim May – guitar (3, 4, 5, 7)
 Nathan Watts – bass guitar (1, 2, 6), handclaps (1, 2, 6)
 Scott Edwards – bass guitar (3, 4, 5, 7)
 Eddie N. Watkins, Jr.  – bass guitar (3, 4, 5, 7)
 Dennis Davis – drums (1, 2, 6)
 Ollie E. Brown – drums (3, 4, 5, 7)
 Ed Greene – drums (3, 4, 5, 7)
 Earl DeRouen – congas (1, 2, 6), handclaps (1, 2, 6)
 Keith Harris – handclaps (1, 2, 6)
 Dick Rudolph – handclaps (1, 2, 6)
 Abdoulaye Soumare – handclaps (1, 2, 6)
 Reggie Wiggins – handclaps (1, 2, 6)
 Gary Coleman – percussion (3, 4, 5, 7)
 Gene Estes – percussion (3, 4, 5, 7)
 Emil Richards – percussion (3, 4, 5, 7)
 Larry Gittens – trumpet (1, 2, 6)
 Don Peake – horn arrangements (3, 4, 5, 7), string arrangements (3, 4, 5, 7), rhythm arrangements (4, 5, 7)
 Alexandra Brown – backing vocals (1, 2, 6)
 Marva Holcolm – backing vocals (1, 2, 6)
 Angela Winbush – backing vocals (1, 2, 6)
 T.K. Carter – backing vocals (3, 4, 5)
 Carolyn Cook – backing vocals (3, 4, 5)
 Suzee Ikeda – backing vocals (3, 4, 5)
 Hazel G. Jackson – backing vocals (3, 5)
 Tina Madison – backing vocals (3, 4)
 Danny Smith – backing vocals (3, 4, 5)

Production
 Producers – Stevie Wonder (Tracks 1, 2 & 6); Jermaine Jackson (Tracks 3, 4, 5 & 7).
 Executive Producers – Berry Gordy, Jr. and Hazel G. Jackson
 Engineers – Jane Clark, Bob Harlan, Cal Harris, Frank Kramer, Steve Miller, John Mills, Gary Olazabal, Ginny Pallante, Bob Robitaille, Abdoulaye Soumare and Russ Terrana.
 Album Coordinator – Suzee Ikeda
 Art Direction – John Cabalka
 Design – Ginny Livingston 
 Photography – Claude Mougin

Trivia
The track "You're Supposed to Keep Your Love for Me" was originally recorded in 1975, possibly for the aborted Do Unto Others album, and featured Stevie Wonder, Michael Jackson and Jackie Jackson on background vocals.  But when Jermaine's brothers left for Epic Records, this original version was shelved.  Four years later, Stevie dug it out and remixed/overdubbed the track for Let's Get Serious and removed Michael and Jackie's vocals.

Charts

Weekly charts

Year-end charts

Singles

Certifications

External links
 Jermaine Jackson-Lets Get Serious at Discogs

References

1980 albums
Jermaine Jackson albums
Albums produced by Stevie Wonder
Motown albums